William Wake (26 January 165724 January 1737) was a priest in the Church of England and Archbishop of Canterbury from 1716 until his death in 1737.

Life
Wake was born in Blandford Forum, Dorset, and educated at Christ Church, Oxford. He took orders, and in 1682 went to Paris as chaplain to the ambassador Richard Graham, Viscount Preston (1648–1695). Here he became acquainted with many of the savants of the capital, and was much interested in French clerical affairs. He also collated some Paris manuscripts of the Greek New Testament for John Fell, bishop of Oxford.

He returned to England in 1685; in 1688 he became preacher at Gray's Inn, and in 1689 he received a canonry of Christ Church, Oxford. In 1693 he was appointed rector of St James's Church, Piccadilly. Ten years later he became Dean of Exeter, and in 1705 he was consecrated bishop of Lincoln. He was translated to the see of Canterbury in 1716 on the death of Thomas Tenison. Tenison had been his mentor, and was responsible for his obtaining his bishopric, despite the notable reluctance of Queen Anne, who regarded the appointment of bishops as her prerogative and distrusted Tenison's judgment.

In 1718 he negotiated with leading French churchmen about a projected union of the Gallican and English churches to resist the claims of Rome. In dealing with Nonconformism he was tolerant, and even advocated a revision of the Prayer Book if that would allay the scruples of dissenters.

His writings are numerous, the chief being his State of the Church and Clergy of England ... historically deduced (London, 1703). In these writings he produced a massive defence of Anglican Orders and again disproved the Nag's Head Fable by citing a number of documentary sources. The work was written in part as a refutation of the arguments of the "high church" opposition to the perceived erastian policies of King William and the then Archbishop of Canterbury Thomas Tenison. He died at his official home, Lambeth Palace.

He was grandfather of the noted English Geologist Etheldred Benett.

He was buried in Croydon Minster in Surrey.

Collections 
Wake bequeathed his collections of printed books, manuscripts and coins to Christ Church. The manuscript volumes include 31 bound volumes of Wake's correspondence.

To the collection of manuscripts belonged minuscule manuscripts of the New Testament: 73, 74, 506-520. These manuscripts came from Constantinople to England about 1731.

Notes

References

External links 

 
 
 

1657 births
1737 deaths
18th-century Anglican archbishops
Alumni of Christ Church, Oxford
Archbishops of Canterbury
Bishops of Lincoln
Chancellors of the College of William & Mary
Deans of Exeter
Members of the Privy Council of Great Britain
People from Blandford Forum
Burials at Croydon Minster
17th-century Anglican theologians
18th-century Anglican theologians